Four ships of the Royal Navy have borne the name HMS Iphigenia, after Iphigenia, a figure in Greek mythology:

  was a 32-gun fifth rate launched in 1780 and burnt by accident in 1801.
  was a 38-gun fifth rate, formerly the Spanish ship Medea. She was captured in 1804 and renamed HMS Imperieuse in 1805. She was placed on harbour service in 1818 and was sold in 1838.
  was a 36-gun fifth rate launched in 1808. She was lent to the Marine Society between 1833 and 1848, and was broken up in 1851.
  was an  protected cruiser launched in 1891, converted to a minelayer in 1910 and sunk as a blockship in the Zeebrugge Raid in 1918.

See also

Notes, citations, and references
Notes

Citations

References

Royal Navy ship names